Eyn-e Do (also Romanized as ‘Eyn-e Do) is a village in Esmailiyeh Rural District, in the Central District of Ahvaz County, Khuzestan Province, Iran. At the 2006 census, its population was 14,226, in 2,543 families.

References 

Populated places in Ahvaz County